National Route 227 is a national highway of Japan connecting Hakodate, Hokkaido and Esashi, Hokkaido in Japan, with a total length of 69.7 km (43.31 mi).

References

National highways in Japan
Roads in Hokkaido